Ashley Banjo's Secret Street Crew is a documentary reality show that has been broadcasting on Sky1 since 29 January 2012.

Each episode follows a group of non-dancers as they learn a street dance routine in secret from Ashley with the help of two or more members of Diversity who act as mentors.

Each episode begins with Ashley meeting the group he will be choreographing for and teaching. After everyone has introduced themselves, Ashley invites a number of the members of Diversity to join him and gives the group a demonstration of what level of dance they are expected to reach by the end of their training. These routines are segments from Diversity's former routines. Ashley will then leave the group with tasks regarding fitness while he and Diversity choreograph the final routine for the group. At the end of each episode, the group surprise their family and friends with the polished performance at an event.

Episodes

Series 1 (2012)

Series 2 (2013)

Series 3 (2014)
On 14 March 2013, it was announced that Ashley Banjo’s Secret Street Crew has been renewed for a third series. The series started airing on Sky 1 on 14 September 2014.

References

External links

2012 British television series debuts
2014 British television series endings
2010s British reality television series
British television documentaries
English-language television shows
Sky UK original programming
Television series by Banijay